Leam or LEAM may refer to:

Places
 River Leam, a river in Warwickshire, England
 Leam, Derbyshire, a hamlet in Derbyshire, England
 Royal Leamington Spa, a town in Warwickshire, England
 Leam, a townland in County Fermanagh, Northern Ireland
 Morton's Leam, a large artificial drainage channel in The Fens, England

People with the given name
 Leam Richardson (born 1979), English footballer

Other uses
 Land Use Evolution and Impact Assessment Model, a computer model
 Lunar Ejecta and Meteorites, an Apollo Lunar Surface Experiments Package
 Almería Airport, Spain, by ICAO code